The Taipingwan Dam (T'aep'yŏngman Dam) is a gravity dam on the lower Yalu River between China and North Korea. The dam was first designed in 1978 and construction began in October 1982. The river was diverted in September 1983 and the first generator was operational on 25 December 1986. The three remaining generators were commissioned in 1987, and the dam was complete in July of that year. China built the dam and operates its 190 MW power station. Power from the dam is used by both China and North Korea.

See also

List of dams and reservoirs in China

References

Dams in China
Hydroelectric power stations in Liaoning
Dams completed in 1987
Dams on the Yalu River
Dams in North Korea
Hydroelectric power stations in North Korea
China–North Korea relations
1987 establishments in China
1987 establishments in North Korea
Buildings and structures in North Pyongan Province